Templeoran is a civil parish in County Westmeath, Ireland.

Templeoran is one of 6 civil parishes in the barony of Moygoish in the Province of Leinster.

Templeoran civil parish comprises 12 townlands: Cartron, Clondardis, Coolnahay, Gaddrystown, Johnstown, Kildallan, Kildallan North, Monroe or Johnstown (Nugent), Parcellstown, Shanonagh, Sonnagh Demesne and
Templeoran also known as Piercefield or Templeoran.

The neighbouring civil parishes are: Leny (barony of Corkaree) to the north, Portloman (Corkaree) to the north‑east, 
Dysart (baronies of Moyashel and Magheradernon, Moycashel and Rathconrath) to the east, Mullingar (Moyashel and Magheradernon) to the south‑east and south, Rathconrath (Rathconrath) to the south‑west,
Kilmacnevan to the west and 
Kilbixy to the north‑west.

See also

Templeoran, a townland

References

External links
Templeoran civil parish at the IreAtlas Townland Data Base
Templeoran civil parish at Townlands.ie
Templeoran civil parish at Logainm.ie

Civil parishes of County Westmeath